For the state pageant affiliated with Miss Teen USA, see Miss Colorado Teen USA

The Miss Colorado's Teen competition is the pageant that selects the representative of the U.S. state of Colorado in the Miss America's Teen pageant.

Allison Carlson of Broomfield was crowned Miss Colorado's Outstanding Teen on May 28, 2022 at the PACE Event Center in Parker, Colorado. She competed at Miss America's Outstanding Teen 2023 pageant at the Hyatt Regency Dallas in Dallas, Texas on August 12, 2022.

In January of 2023, the official name of the pageant was changed from Miss Colorado’s Outstanding Teen, to Miss Colorado’s Teen, in accordance with the national pageant.

Results summary 
The following is a visual summary of the results present in table seen below. The year in parentheses indicates year of Miss America's Outstanding Teen competition the award/placement was garnered.

Placements 
 Top 10: Meredith Winnefeld (2012)
 Top 12: Abigail Schwartz (2015), Sara Al-Bazali (2019)
 Top 15: Jocelyn Story (2006), Caitlin Quisenberry (2014)

Awards

Other awards 
 Miss Congeniality/Spirit of America: Janelle Orsborn (2010)
 Advertising Award: Lexie O'Dowd (2011)
 America's Choice Award: Caitlin Quisenberry (2014)
 Scholastic Excellence Award: Molly Casey (2013)

Winners

External links
 Official website

Notes

References

Colorado
Colorado culture
Women in Colorado
Annual events in Colorado